Evan Nicholas Skoug (born October 21, 1995) is an American professional baseball catcher in the Chicago White Sox organization. He attended Texas Christian University (TCU) and played college baseball for the TCU Horned Frogs.

Career
Skoug attended Libertyville High School in Libertyville, Illinois. Considered a potential second or third round pick in the MLB draft, Skoug wanted to go to college. He fell to the 34th round of the 2014 MLB draft, where he was selected by the Washington Nationals. Skoug did not sign, and enrolled at Texas Christian University (TCU). As a freshman for the TCU Horned Frogs, he batted .285 and led the team with 46 RBIs. He was named a Freshman All-American. After the 2015 season, he played collegiate summer baseball with the Falmouth Commodores of the Cape Cod Baseball League. In 2017, he struggled in his first 20 games of the season, batting below the Mendoza Line. After making adjustments to his swing, Skoug ended the season with 20 home runs. He was named Big 12 Conference Baseball Player of the Year.

The Chicago White Sox selected Skoug in the seventh round of the 2017 MLB draft. Skoug signed with the White Sox, receiving a $300,000 signing bonus. After signing, he was assigned to the AZL White Sox, and after batting .529 with one home run and three RBIs in four games, was promoted to the Kannapolis Intimidators where he finished the season, posting a .154 batting average with two home runs and seven RBIs in 21 games. He returned to Kannapolis in 2018, batting .192 with five home runs and 31 RBIs in 83 games.

Skoug once again returned to Kannapolis to begin 2019.

Personal life
Skoug was born in Kalamazoo, Michigan. He has an older brother and older sister.

References

External links

1995 births
Living people
People from Libertyville, Illinois
Baseball players from Illinois
People from Kalamazoo, Michigan
Baseball players from Michigan
Baseball catchers
TCU Horned Frogs baseball players
Falmouth Commodores players
Arizona League White Sox players
Kannapolis Intimidators players
Winston-Salem Dash players